The 1989 Southwest Conference baseball tournament was the league's annual postseason tournament used to determine the Southwest Conference's (SWC) automatic bid to the 1989 NCAA Division I baseball tournament. The tournament was held from May 18 through 20 at Olsen Field on the campus of Texas A&M University in College Station, Texas.

The number 1 seed  went 3–0 to win the team's second SWC tournament under head coach Mark Johnson.

Format and seeding 
The tournament featured the top four finishers of the SWC's 8 teams in a double-elimination tournament.

Texas A&M won the tiebreaker over Arkansas based on a 2–1 head to head record.

Tournament

References 

Tournament
Southwest Conference Baseball Tournament
Southwest Conference baseball tournament